Bradley Toshio Katsuyama (born 1978) is a Canadian financial services executive. He is the CEO and co-founder of the IEX, the Investors Exchange. He left RBC in 2012 to co-found IEX under the premise that it would be a fairer stock trading venue than other exchanges.

Through his work with IEX, Katsuyama is featured in Flash Boys, a 2014 non-fiction book by Michael Lewis about high-frequency trading (HFT) in the financial markets.

Early life and education
Born in 1978, Katsuyama is a native of Markham, Ontario, Canada. He is a graduate of Wilfrid Laurier University in Waterloo, Ontario, where he attended Lazaridis School of Business and Economics.

Career

RBC and pre-IEX career
Before founding IEX, Katsuyama worked for many years at the Royal Bank of Canada. He held management roles in US cash equity trading, hedge fund coverage and US technology trading. Later he became the global head of electronic sales and trading, overseeing electronic sales, electronic trading, algorithmic trading, market structure strategy, client implementation and product management.

HFT problems, discovery and response
While at RBC, he noticed that placing a single large order that can be fulfilled only through many different stock exchanges was being taken advantage of by stock scalpers. Scalpers, noticing the order would not be able to be fulfilled by one single exchange, would instead buy the securities on the other exchanges, so that by the time the rest of the large order arrived to those exchanges the scalpers could sell the securities at a higher price. All these events would happen in milliseconds not perceivable to humans but perceivable to computers. Katsuyama led a team that implemented THOR, a securities' order-management system where large orders are split into many different sub-orders with each sub-order arriving at the same time to all the exchanges through the use of intentional delays.

Post-RBC and IEX founding
Katsuyama left RBC in 2012 to start what he considered to be a fairer stock trading venue, the Investors Exchange IEX.  IEX is an emerging stock exchange, organized as an alternative trading system, also known as a dark pool; company representatives have stated their intention to convert to a public exchange upon reaching sufficient trading volume. It opened for its first day of trading on October 25, 2013. William O'Brien, at the time president of competing business BATS Global Markets, during a debate on CNBC, asserted in April 2014 the IEX was trying to build its business by generating 'fear', 'mistrust' and 'accusations'.

Katsuyama and his work at IEX is featured in Flash Boys, a 2014 non-fiction book by financial writer Michael Lewis about high-frequency trading (HFT) in the financial markets. Lewis praised IEX as an appropriate and beneficial response to HFT abuses. Since the publishing of Flash Boys and the opening of IEX, several U.S. authorities have confirmed they are looking into certain practices used by high-frequency traders. The FBI, the U.S. Securities and Exchange Commission, the U.S. Justice Department and the Attorney General of New York State all have investigations underway.

IEX approvals
The SEC approved the IEX to be an official exchange on June 17, 2016, with Katsuyama remaining IEX CEO. On October 24, 2017, IEX Group Inc. received regulatory approval from the SEC to list companies. IEX said it would begin listings in early 2018, with a focus on getting companies to switch over from other stock exchanges, by undercutting listing fees of rivals. Katsuyama remains chairman of the IEX board.

Personal life
Katsuyama lives in New York with his wife Ashley and his two sons, Brandon and Rylan.

See also
List of people from Markham, Ontario

References

External links
Profile at IEX

Canadian businesspeople
Living people
Royal Bank of Canada people
1978 births
Wilfrid Laurier University alumni
People from Markham, Ontario